Jat Muslim or Musalman Jat,  also spelled Jatt or Jutt, are an ethnoreligious group and a sub-group of the Jat people, who are followers of Islam and are native to the northern regions of the Indian Subcontinent.  They are found primarily throughout Sindh and Punjab regions of Pakistan, with a small population in Afghanistan. Jats began converting to Islam from the early Middle Ages onward, and constitute a distinct sub-group within the diverse community of Jat people.

History
The original homeland of the Jats was the lower Indus valley. It is known that they were nomadic pastoralists who had migrated from the lower Indus river valley of Sindh and Balochistan to the north in Punjab during the Middle Ages. They were earliest people in the Indian subcontinent to have interacted with the Muslims as multiple trading communities of Jats already existed in the pre-Islamic Arabia. Jats were referred as Zatts in early Arab writings and Jat-an in Persian. They were present in Mesopotamia and Syria since the time of Sassanid emperor Bahram V (420–38) and were recruited in the Sassanid army as Siyabija and Andāghar. It is narrated in Sahih Al-Bukhari that prophet Muhammad described prophet Musa as "Musa was of brown complexion, straight hair and tall stature as if he was from the people of Az-Zutt [Jats]". Jats fought against the Muslims in the battle of Chains in 634 and later also fought on the side of Ali in the Battle of the Camel in 656 under their chief, Ali B. Danur.

When Arabs entered Sindh and southern Punjab regions of Pakistan in the seventh century, the chief tribal groupings they found were the Jats and the Med people. The Jats were employed as soldiers by the new Muslim administration in Sindh, with a special group known as Sayabijah serving as the treasurers in Basra during the reign of Ali, whose chief Abū Sālama al - Zutti was said to be a pious man. The Muslim conquest chronicles point at the important concentrations of Jats in towns and fortresses of Lower and Central Sindh. After Muslim conquest of Sindh in 712, multiple communities of Jats appeared in Iran and Khorasan, and a district they inhabited in Khuzistan or Bahrain came to be known as Al-Zutt, as well as a quarter in Antioch which was also called Az-Zutt. Some of the Jats who were made war prisoners became later famous in the Muslim world, such as the great Imam Abu Hanifa, according to some scholars including Wink, and Imam Awza'i. By mid 9th century, their population in the middle east well exceeded 27,000. In 815, a Jat Muslim Al-Sari ibn al Hakam al-Zutti became the  emir of Egypt amidst the Abbasid civil war. He was first to attempt for establishing an autonomous Muslim dynasty in Egypt (815–826), and his sons Ubaydallah and Abu Nasr ruled Egypt until it was re-conquered by the Abbasid general Abdallah ibn Tahir in 826. In 834, Jats rose into revolt against the Abbasid caliphate under their leader Muhammad bin Uthman in the lower Iraq. The rebels were defeated and deported to the village of Al-Zaffaraniya at the Arab-Byzantine border. In 907, a Zutt Ismaili da'i Abu Hatim al-Zutti became active in the region. His followers were called Baqliyya, a sub-sect of Qarmatians, who staged multiple uprisings against the Abbasids in south Iraq. Afterwards, Jats lost their distinct identity in the Mesopotamia that they had previously, probably merging with the Marsh Arabs of Iraq. 

Between the 10th and the 13th century, when Soomra dynasty came to power in Sindh, there was a large immigration of Jat groups northwards to Punjab and eastwards towards what is now Rajasthan. Between the 11th and the 13th centuries, the Jats became essentially a farming population, taking advantage in the growth of irrigation. As these Jats became farmers, they started accepting Islam. Most Jats clans of western Punjab have traditions that they accepted Islam at the hands of Sufi saints of Punjab. Critically, the process of conversion was said to have been a much slower process. In 1336, Samma dynasty (1336–1524) replaced Soomras. Samma was originally a sub-division of Jats when the Arabs initially conquered Sindh. The Samma dynasty has left its mark in Sindh with  structures including the necropolis of Makli and royalties in Thatta. By this time, Muslim Jats had large populations in Punjab and Gujarat, with both Langah dynasty (1445–1540) in Multan and Muzaffarid dynasty (1407–1573) in Gujarat sometimes described as having Jat origins, although other theories are also suggested.

In the following centuries, Muslim Jats continued their migration towards Gangetic valley. By the time  Mughal empire was established in 1525, they had transitioned from a nomadic lifestyle to a purely farming one. During the era of Mughals there appears to be a little change in their position, with one Nawab Sa'adullah Khan even serving as the Grand Vizier from 1645 to 1656. After the decline of Mughal empire, many communities rose to into revolt. One of them were Afghan Rohillas, who had settled into Rohilkhand by then in large numbers. Their dynasty, the Rohilla dynasty (1714–1774) descended from  Nawab Ali Muhammed Khan, who was a Jat boy of age eight when he was adopted by the chief of the Barech tribe, Sardar Daud Khan Rohilla. Due to the role he played in the establishment of Rohilkhand and in the general history of Rohillas, he gained recognition as a Rohilla chief, however, he was not Afghan by birth. Although the Rohillas lost their kingdom after the first Rohilla War in 1774, Faizullah Khan, son of Ali Mohammed Khan, managed to become Nawab of princely state of Rampur. The Kalhoras (1701–1783) of Sindh were also probably from Channa tribe, a sub-division of Jats.

Social organization
In the plains of Punjab, there are many communities of Jat, some of whom had converted to Islam by the 18th century. Those clans that converted to Islam remained in what is now Pakistani Punjab after Partition. In Pakistan, most Jats are land-owning agriculturalists, and they form one of the numerous ethnic group in Sindh.

Jats, together with the Rajputs and Gujjars, are the dominant ethnically-Punjabi and religiously-Islamic tribes settled in the regions comprising eastern Pakistan. They exert considerable influence in various mainstays of Pakistani society, including the realms of the judiciary, agriculture industry, private sector, academia, and military.

Notable people
Abu Hanifa (699–767), Islamic scholar and eponymous founder of the Hanafi school of Sunni jurisprudence
Abd al-Rahman al-Awza'i (707–774), Islamic scholar and eponymous founder of the ʾAwzāʿī school of Sunni jurisprudence
Al-Sari ibn al-Hakam ibn Yusuf Al-Zutti (d.820), emir of Egypt
Abu Hatim al-Zutti (c.907), an Ismaili da'i and founder of Baqliyya sub-sect of Qarmatians
Nawab Sa'adullah Khan (1591–1656), the Mughal Grand Vizier
Nawab Ali Muhammed Khan (1707–1748), the founder of the kingdom of Rohilkhand and Rohilla dynasty
Nawab Faizullah Khan (1730–1794), son of Muhammed Ali Khan and founder of Rampur State
Feroz Khan Noon (1893–1970), 7th Pakistani Prime Minister
Shujaat Hussain (born 1940), 16th Pakistani Prime Minister
Mohammad Afzal Cheema (1913–2008), former Pakistani President
Hamid Nasir Chattha (born 1944), former Pakistani President
Muhammad Rafiq Tarar (1929–2022), 9th Pakistani President

See also
Punjabi Muslims
List of Punjabi Muslims

References

External links
Jat (caste) on Encyclopedia Britannica

Punjabi tribes
Jat
Jat clans of Punjab
Jat clans of Jammu and Kashmir
Jat clans of India
Jat clans of Pakistan